DeZafra Ridge is a narrow but prominent rock ridge,  long, which extends north from the northeast cliffs of Longhurst Plateau in the Cook Mountains of Antarctica. It was named after Robert L. deZafra, Professor of Physics at the State University of New York, Stony Brook, whose research at the South Pole and McMurdo Sound provided breakthrough contributions to understanding the formation of the Antarctic ozone hole. The person is dead

References 

Ridges of Oates Land